Davyd-Haradok or David-Gorodok is a city in Brest Region, Belarus. It has a population of 5,991 (2021 estimate).

History
Within the Grand Duchy of Lithuania, Davyd-Haradok was part of Brest Litovsk Voivodeship. In 1793, Davyd-Haradok was acquired by the Russian Empire in the course of the Second Partition of Poland.

The 18 March 1921 Peace of Riga between Poland on one side and Soviet Russia and Soviet Ukraine on the other defined Davyd-Haradok (Dawidgródek) as part of Poland in the interwar period. The USSR retook the town in 1939. 

In 1940, more than a third of the total population was Jewish, 4,350 Jews. 

During World War II, Davyd-Haradok was under German occupation from 7 July 1941 until 9 July 1944. On 10 August 1941, 3,000 Jews older than 14 years old were murdered in a mass execution perpetrated by an Einsatzgruppen unit consisting of Germans and their collaborators.

Survivors were imprisoned in a ghetto where they were forced to perform forced labour and suffered harsh living conditions, many deaths.
On 10 September 1942, 1,263 remaining inhabitants of the ghetto, the vast majority women and children, were murdered. About a hundred of them managed to escape to the forest.

References

External links
 Photos on Radzima.org
 Memorial for the Jewish population murdered during World War 2
 

Cities in Belarus
Shtetls
Populated places in Brest Region
Stolin District
Brest Litovsk Voivodeship
Mozyrsky Uyezd
Polesie Voivodeship
Holocaust locations in Belarus